Narrow Gauge Railway Museum in Sochaczew (Polish: Muzeum Kolei Wąskotorowej w Sochaczewie) is a -gauge heritage railway based at Sochaczew in Poland, about  west of Warsaw. The museum's headquarters are that of the former Sochaczew County Narrow Gauge Railway (Polish: Sochaczewska Kolej Powiatowa). It has a fleet of historic 750mm-gauge steam, diesel and electric locomotives, goods wagons, passenger cars and draisines. It has also a small number of standard gauge and other exhibits.

Part of the railway has been restored to service. Trains from the museum to Kampinos Forest run on Saturdays from the end of May until the mid-September and also on Wednesdays during the summer holidays.

The museum was established in 1984 and opened in 1986. It is a branch of the Railway Museum in Warsaw. Due to the uncertain status of land property and financial difficulties the future of both is uncertain.

History

Regular service of Sochaczew County Narrow Gauge Railway ended on 30 November 1984, and the museum was established in December. In the early days all efforts were made to repair, renovate and protect premises, vehicles and to do the necessary repairs of the tracks and vehicles. Preservation and repair works started. Archives and some of the exhibition rooms were placed in the station main building. Also the sheds for draisines were converted into exhibition rooms.

Sporadic train services began in May 1986. The museum was opened to the public on 6 September 1986. By the end of 1986 the museum had collected 107 vehicles, including 33 steam locomotives. In the 1996 this number reached 253. In 2009 the total number of all types of rolling stock was 263, including 56 steam locomotives. After scrapping and selling several units this number fell to 228 in 2011.

Some of the vehicles still need substantial restoration before moving from storage to display.

In the late 1980s the tracks were repaired, mainly sleepers replacements but also two bridges were fixed. On 10 July 1991 the Technical Commission of Narrow Gauge Railways (Polish: Komisja Techniczna z Zarządu Kolei Dojazdowych) granted clearance to operate the line to Wilcze Tułowskie, where the trains now terminate.

Preserved rolling stock (selection)

Steam locomotives:
Pw53-1980
Px29-1704 (in service)
Px48-1755 (awaiting repair)
Px49-1794 
Px49-1796 
Px49-1797 
Py4-741 
Tx4-1315
Ty10914
Tya6-3326 

Diesel locomotives:
Lxd2-250
Lxd2-342
Lyd1
WLs75

Passenger cars
1Aw

Notes

References

Links

Muzeum Kolei Wąskotorowej w Sochaczewie – official website (in Polish)

1984 establishments in Poland
History of rail transport in Poland
Museums established in 1984
Museums in Masovian Voivodeship
Railway museums in Poland
Sochaczew County